José María Villalta Florez-Estrada (born August 13, 1977)  is a Costa Rican attorney, environmentalist and politician. He was the only representative in the Costa Rican Parliament of the leftist party Frente Amplio (Broad Front) for the period that comprised 2010–2014. Villalta also was the candidate of the Frente Amplio for the presidential elections of 2014 in Costa Rica.

Biography

José María is the son of Laura Florez-Estrada (a Peruvian citizen) and Mario Salazar Villalta (a Costa Rica citizen). He attended primary school in Peru, where he lived some years with his maternal family. In Costa Rica he attended middle school and high school. Later he studied at the University of Costa Rica, where he held positions in student organizations such as the Association of Law Students and the High Student Council (1997-1998). He was a student representative on the University Council and a board member of the Federation of Students (FEUCR) in 1998–2000. During his years as university student, Villalta actively participated in marches against neoliberal reforms. In 2002 he graduated with a degree in law. Between 2001 and 2009, he hosted a television program dedicated to ecological topics.

José María was first parliamentary advisor of José Merino del Río in the last two years of his first term with the Partido Fuerza Democrática (Democratic Force Party) (2000-2002). Then he was advisor of the deputy Gerardo Vargas with Partido Acción Ciudadana (Citizens Action Party) and again with José Merino's advisor in  2002–2006 with the Frente Amplio (Broad Front). He was then elected to the Parliament on the list of San José. He was also an active participant in the movement against CAFTA.

On March 9, the National Assembly chose Villalta as the Frente Amplio candidate for the presidential elections in February 2014. He was defeated in the first of two rounds of elections, where he obtained around seventeen percent of the valid votes.

Since 2008, Villalta lives in a committed relationship with the journalist Lauren Chinchilla Alvarado. They have one son.

References

1977 births
Living people
People from San José, Costa Rica
Broad Front (Costa Rica) politicians
Members of the Legislative Assembly of Costa Rica
University of Costa Rica alumni
Costa Rican agnostics